My Lady's Past is a 1929 American drama film directed by Albert Ray and starring Belle Bennett, Joe E. Brown and Alma Bennett. After completing his first novel, a writer abandons his wife for his secretary. It is now considered a lost film

Cast
 Belle Bennett as Mamie Reynolds 
 Joe E. Brown as Sam Young 
 Alma Bennett as Typist 
 Russell Simpson as John Parker 
 Joan Standing as Maid 
 Billie Bennett as Gossip

References

Bibliography
 Pitts, Michael R. Poverty Row Studios, 1929–1940: An Illustrated History of 55 Independent Film Companies, with a Filmography for Each. McFarland & Company, 2005.

External links
 

1929 films
1929 drama films
1920s English-language films
Films directed by Albert Ray
Tiffany Pictures films
Lost American films
American black-and-white films
Lost drama films
1929 lost films
1920s American films